David McLaughlin may refer to:

 David McLaughlin (political figure), Canadian chief of staff to prime minister Brian Mulroney
 David T. McLaughlin (1932–2004), president of Dartmouth College
 David McLaughlin (basketball), head coach of the Dartmouth College's men's basketball team
 Dave McLaughlin, American writer, director and producer
 David McLaughlin (bluegrass) (born 1958), American multi-instrumentalist musician.